The 1965 Washington Huskies football team was an American football team that represented the University of Washington during the 1965 NCAA University Division football season.  In its ninth season under head coach Jim Owens, the team compiled a 5–5 record, finished in fourth place in the Athletic Association of Western Universities, and outscored its opponents 205 to 185.

Ron Medved and Ralph Winters were the team captains.

Schedule

Game summaries

Washington State

Source:

All-Coast

Professional football draft selections
Three University of Washington Huskies were selected in the 1966 NFL Draft, which lasted twenty rounds with 305 selections. One Husky was selected in the 1966 AFL Draft, which lasted twenty rounds with 181 selections. This was the final year of separate drafts; a common draft was introduced for 1967.

References

Washington
Washington Huskies football seasons
Washington Huskies football